The Militia Act 1745 (19 Geo. II, c.2) was an Act of Parliament of the Parliament of Great Britain passed in 1745 and formally repealed in 1867. It made provision for calling out the militia in England during the Second Jacobite Rising.

The Act provided that at any time up to the 30 November 1746, the militia could be embodied for active service, with each soldier to be provided with a month's pay, advanced locally and repaid within six months. Any regiment of militia would be liable to serve throughout the country.

The Act was formally repealed as expired by the Statute Law Revision Act 1867.

References
The statutes at large from the 15th to the 20th year of King George III [vol. XVIII]; Charles Bathurst, London. 1765.
Chronological table of the statutes; HMSO, London. 1993. 

1745 in England
1745 in Scotland
Repealed Great Britain Acts of Parliament
Great Britain Acts of Parliament 1745